Metaphidippus is a genus of jumping spiders that was first described by Frederick Octavius Pickard-Cambridge in 1901. The name is combined from Ancient Greek μετά "after, beside" and the salticid genus Phidippus.

Species
 it contains forty-six species, found only in South America, Central America, and North America:
Metaphidippus albopilosus (Peckham & Peckham, 1901) – Brazil, Paraguay, Argentina
Metaphidippus annectans (Chamberlin, 1929) – USA
Metaphidippus apicalis F. O. Pickard-Cambridge, 1901 – Mexico
Metaphidippus bicavatus F. O. Pickard-Cambridge, 1901 – Panama
Metaphidippus bisignatus Mello-Leitão, 1945 – Argentina
Metaphidippus bispinosus F. O. Pickard-Cambridge, 1901 – Central America
Metaphidippus carmenensis (Chamberlin, 1924) – USA, Mexico
Metaphidippus chalcedon (C. L. Koch, 1846) – Brazil
Metaphidippus chera (Chamberlin, 1924) – USA, Mexico
Metaphidippus coccinelloides Mello-Leitão, 1947 – Brazil
Metaphidippus comptus (Banks, 1909) – Costa Rica
Metaphidippus crassidens (Kraus, 1955) – El Salvador
Metaphidippus cupreus F. O. Pickard-Cambridge, 1901 – Panama
Metaphidippus cuprinus (Taczanowski, 1878) – Peru
Metaphidippus diplacis (Chamberlin, 1924) – USA, Mexico
Metaphidippus dubitabilis (Peckham & Peckham, 1896) – Mexico
Metaphidippus emmiltus Maddison, 1996 – USA
Metaphidippus facetus Chickering, 1946 – Panama
Metaphidippus fastosus Chickering, 1946 – Panama
Metaphidippus fimbriatus (F. O. Pickard-Cambridge, 1901) – Guatemala
Metaphidippus fortunatus (Peckham & Peckham, 1901) – Brazil
Metaphidippus globosus F. O. Pickard-Cambridge, 1901 – Costa Rica
Metaphidippus gratus Bryant, 1948 – Mexico
Metaphidippus inflatus F. O. Pickard-Cambridge, 1901 – Guatemala
Metaphidippus iridescens F. O. Pickard-Cambridge, 1901 – El Salvador, Panama
Metaphidippus iviei (Roewer, 1951) – USA
Metaphidippus laetabilis (Peckham & Peckham, 1896) – Panama
Metaphidippus laetificus Chickering, 1946 – Panama
Metaphidippus lanceolatus F. O. Pickard-Cambridge, 1901 – Mexico to Costa Rica
Metaphidippus longipalpus F. O. Pickard-Cambridge, 1901 – USA, Panama
Metaphidippus mandibulatus F. O. Pickard-Cambridge, 1901 (type) – Costa Rica
Metaphidippus manni (Peckham & Peckham, 1901) – North America
Metaphidippus nigropictus F. O. Pickard-Cambridge, 1901 – Mexico
Metaphidippus nitidus (Peckham & Peckham, 1896) – Guatemala
Metaphidippus odiosus (Peckham & Peckham, 1901) – Brazil, Argentina
Metaphidippus ovatus F. O. Pickard-Cambridge, 1901 – Guatemala
Metaphidippus pallens F. O. Pickard-Cambridge, 1901 – Guatemala to Costa Rica
Metaphidippus perfectus (Peckham & Peckham, 1901) – Brazil
Metaphidippus pernix F. O. Pickard-Cambridge, 1901 – Guatemala
Metaphidippus perscitus Chickering, 1946 – Panama
Metaphidippus pluripunctatus Mello-Leitão, 1944 – Argentina
Metaphidippus quadrinotatus F. O. Pickard-Cambridge, 1901 – Costa Rica, Panama
Metaphidippus siticulosus (Peckham & Peckham, 1909) – USA
Metaphidippus smithi (Peckham & Peckham, 1901) – Brazil
Metaphidippus texanus (Banks, 1904) – USA
Metaphidippus tropicus (Peckham & Peckham, 1901) – Brazil, Argentina

References

Salticidae genera
Salticidae
Spiders of North America
Spiders of South America
Taxa named by Frederick Octavius Pickard-Cambridge